Aryldialkylphosphatase (EC 3.1.8.1, also known as phosphotriesterase, organophosphate hydrolase, parathion hydrolase, paraoxonase, and parathion aryl esterase; systematic name aryltriphosphate dialkylphosphohydrolase) is a metalloenzyme that hydrolyzes the triester linkage found in organophosphate insecticides:

an aryl dialkyl phosphate + H2O  dialkyl phosphate + an aryl alcohol

The gene (opd, for organophosphate-degrading) that codes for the enzyme is found in a large plasmid (pSC1, 51Kb) endogenous to Pseudomonas diminuta, although the gene has also been found in many other bacterial species such as Flavobacterium sp. (ATCC27551), where it is also encoded in an extrachromosomal element (pSM55, 43Kb).

Organophosphate is the general name for esters of phosphoric acid and is one of the organophosphorus compounds. They can be found as part of insecticides, herbicides, and nerve gases, amongst others. Some less-toxic organophosphates can be used as solvents, plasticizers, and EP additives. The use of organophosphates accounts for approximately 38% of all pesticide use globally.

Gene 
Bacterial isolates capable of degrading organophosphate (OP) pesticides have been identified from soil samples from different parts of the world. The first organophosphate-degrading bacterial species was isolated from a soil sample from the Philippines in 1973, which identified as Flavobacterium sp. ATCC27551. Since then, other species have demonstrated to have OP-degrading abilities, such as Pseudomonas diminuta (isolated from US soil sample), Agrobacterium radiobacter (isolated from Australian soil sample), Alteromonas haloplanktis (isolated from US soil sample), and Pseudomonas sp. WBC-3 (isolated from Chinese soil sample).

The capacity to hydrolyze organophosphates is not unique to bacteria. A few fungi and cyanobacteria species have been found to also hydrolyze them. Moreover, through sequence homology searches of whole genomes, several other bacterial species were identified that also contain sequences from the same gene family as opd, including pathogenic bacteria such as Escherichia coli (yhfV) and Mycobacterium tuberculosis.

The gene sequence encoding the enzyme (opd) in Flavobacterium sp. ATCC27551 and Pseudomonas diminuta is highly conserved (100% sequence homology), although the plasmids where the genes are found have very different sequences apart from a 5.1Kb conserved region where the gene is found.

A closer look on the organization of the opd gene from Flavobacterium suggests a potential transposon-like architecture, which accounts for the widespread distribution of the gene among other microbial species that might have occurred through lateral DNA transfer. The opd gene is flanked by transposition insertion sequences, characteristic of Tn3 family of transposons. Moreover, a transposase-like sequence (homologous to TnpA) and a resolvase-like sequence (homologous to TnpR) were also identified in regions upstream of the opd gene, which are characteristics of class II transposons such as Tn3.

Furthermore, another open reading frame was identified downstream of opd and encodes a protein that further degrades p-nitrophenol, one of the byproducts of OP degradation. This protein is believed to work as a complex with PTE, since  a dramatic increase in activity is observed when PTE is present.

Therefore, the characteristic architectural organization of the opd gene region suggests that different species acquired the gene through horizontal transfer through transposition and plasmid transfer.

Protein

Structure 
Phosphotriesterase (PTE)  belongs to a family metalloenzymes that has two catalytic Zn2+ metal atoms, bridged via a common ligand and coordinated by imidazole side chains of histidine residues that are clustered around the metal atoms. The protein forms a homodimer. The overall structure consists of an α/β-barrel motif, also present in other 20 catalytic proteins. The active sites of these proteins is located at the C-terminal portion of the β-barrel, which is where the active site of PTE is also located.

Catalysis 
Catalysis of organophosphates occurs via a nucleophilic substitution with inversion of configuration (SN2 mechanism) about the phosphorus centre of the substrate. In the active site, the metal cations aid in catalysis by further polarizing the P–O bond of the substrate, which makes it more susceptible to a nucleophilic attack. Furthermore, a basic residue abstracts a proton from a water molecule, and the hydroxide ion produced bridges the two divalent cations and acts as the nucleophile. The OH− then attacks the phosphorus centre of the substrate, followed by a proton transfer event. The P–O bond is broken, and the products are released from the active site. The turnover rate (kcat) of phosphotriesterase is nearly 104 s−1 for the hydrolysis of paraoxon, and the products are p-nitrophenol and diethyl phosphoric acid.

Species 
Phosphotriesterase is present in two species, Pseudomonas diminuta and Flavobacterium sp. ATCC27551. Other gene variants that also encode organophosphate-degrading enzymes are present in other species. The list includes bacterial species such as the radioresistant Deinococcus radiodurans, pathogens Mycobacterium tuberculosis and Mycobacterium bovis, the anaerobic bacterium Desulfatibacillum alkenivorans, the thermophilic bacteria Geobacillus sp. and Thermoanaerobacter sp. X514, Escherichia coli (yhfV) and many other groups of bacteria, and also some Archaea such as Sulfolobus acidocaldarius.

Subcellular localization 
Phosphotriesterase is a membrane-associated protein that is translated with a 29 amino acid-long target peptide (Tat motif), which is then cleaved from the mature protein after insertion in the plasma membrane. The protein is anchored to the inner membrane of the cell, facing the periplasm.

Function 

The enzyme phosphotriesterase hydrolyzes organophosphate compounds by cleaving the triester linkage in the substrate. 

The enzyme has a very broad substrate specificity, and is very efficient in catalyzing the reaction: PTE hydrolyzes paraoxon at a rate approaching the diffusion limit, which indicates that the enzyme is optimally evolved for using this substrate. It acts specifically on synthetic organophosphate triesters and phosphorofluoridates. It does not seem to have a natural occurring substrate and may thus have optimally evolved for utilizing paraoxon and other common agricultural pesticides.

The products of the reaction are diethyl phosphoric acid and p-nitrophenol. The latter product is further degraded by an enzyme encoded 750bp downstream of the opd gene, and encodes a 29kDa putative hydrolase that may be involved in degrading aromatic compounds, and works in concert with PTE. This enzyme is homologous to hydrolases in Pseudomonas putida, Pseudomonas azelaica, Rhodococcus sp., and P. fluorescens.

Organophosphates are not toxic to bacteria, but they act as acetylcholinesterase inhibitors in animals. Some species of bacteria are also able to utilize organophosphates as a nutrient and carbon source.

Environmental significance 
Phosphotriesterases are considered a strong candidate biocatalyst for bioremediation purposes. Its wide substrate specificity and catalytic efficiency makes it an attractive target for the potential use of microbes containing the opd gene in detoxifying soils that are toxic due to pesticide overuse. Moreover, organophosphates act as acetylcholinesterase (AChE) inhibitors. The AChE neurotransmitter is a vital component of the central nervous system (CNS) in insects in animals, and the inhibition of the proper turnover of this neurochemical results in overstimulation of the CNS, which ultimately results in death of insects and mammals. As a result, the use of organophosphate-degrading microorganisms is a potentially effective, low-cost, and environmentally friendly method of removing these toxic compounds from the environment.

History 
Bacterial species that had the ability to degrade organophosphate pesticides have been isolated from soil samples from different parts of the world. The first bacterial strain identified to be able to hydrolyze organophosphates was Flavobacterium sp. ATCC 27551, found by Sethunathan and Yoshida in 1973 from a soil sample originally from the Philippines. Since then, other species were found to also have organophosphate-degrading enzymes similar to that found in Flavobacterium.

References

Further reading 

 
 
 
 

EC 3.1.8
Enzymes of known structure